CEPP is an acronym for the name of a chemotherapy regimen that is intended for treatment of aggressive non-Hodgkin lymphomas. Unlike CHOP, this chemotherapy regimen does not contain doxorubicin or any other anthracycline. Thus, it can be used in patients with severe cardiovascular diseases and contraindications for doxorubicin-containing regimens. There are 2 modifications of CEPP -  with the addition of bleomycin, called CEPP (B), and without bleomycin - ordinary CEPP.

This regimen also does not contain vincristine and can be used in patients with neuropathy.

In combination with anti-CD20, monoclonal, antibody, and rituximab. this regimen is called R-CEPP(B).

[R]-CEPP(B) regimen consists of:
  - a monoclonal antibody that is able to kill CD20-positive B cells, either normal or malignant;
 (C)yclophosphamide  - an alkylating antineoplastic agent;
  - a topoisomerase inhibitor from the epipodophyllotoxin group;
   - an alkylating antineoplastic agent;
  or  - a glucocorticoid hormone that has the ability to cause apoptosis and lysis of lymphocytes, either normal or malignant;
   - an antitumor antibiotic.

Dosing regimen

References 

Chemotherapy regimens used in lymphoma